Arnaud Labbe (born 3 November 1976 in Creil, Oise) is a French racing cyclist who rides for the CC Périgueux Dordogne team. Labbe competes in road and cyclo-cross events.

For the 2014 season, Labbe returned to the amateur ranks with CC Périgueux Dordogne.

Palmares

Cyclo-cross

2002–2003
3rd National Championships
2003–2004
2nd National Championships
2004–2005
3rd National Championships
2005–2006
3rd National Championships

Road

2001
9th Manx International
2002
7th Manx International
2003
1st Prix des Flandres Françaises
4th Manx International
2005
2nd Overall Tour de la Manche
1st Stage 2
3rd Overall Étoile de Bessèges
5th Flèche Hesbigonne
6th Overall Tour de la Somme
8th La Poly Normande
9th Overall Tour de Normandie
10th Bordeaux-Saintes

References

External links

1976 births
Living people
People from Creil
Cyclo-cross cyclists
French male cyclists
Sportspeople from Oise
Cyclists from Hauts-de-France